King Oscar may refer to:

People 
 Oscar I of Sweden, King of Sweden and Norway
 Oscar II, King of Sweden and Norway

Brand names 
 King Oscar brand canned seafood